The Longest Day in Chang'an is a 2019 Chinese historical suspense drama directed by Cao Dun and written by Paw Studio. The series stars Lei Jiayin and Jackson Yee. It is based on the novel of the same name by Ma Boyong. The Longest Day in Chang'an is produced jointly by Youku, Beijing Weying Technology Co., Ltd, Liu Bai Entertainment and Yuyue Film Co., Ltd. The series follows the characters Zhang Xiaojing and Li Bi, and their efforts to foil a terrorist attack on Chang'an, the capital of the Tang dynasty (618–907).  It began airing in China on Youku from June 27, 2019.

Story
Zhang Xiaojing is a former soldier in the Longyou Army who served on the frontiers of the Tang dynasty. After retiring, he joined the local security of the city of Chang'an, the heart of the empire, but he was imprisoned and sentenced to death after an incident in which Zhang killed 34 members of a gang that murdered his former Army commander Wen, and then killed his current commanding officer.

Zhang is unexpectedly reprieved when plans for a major rebellion are uncovered, involving a terrorist cell, the Wolf Squad, which has slipped  into Chang'an before the Lantern Festival, one of the most spectacular days in the ancient Chinese calendar. To secure the safety of the Chang'an people, the Jing'an Si (Department of City Security) grants Zhang a special 24-hour amnesty, and he is ordered to catch the terrorists and foil the plot before the day is out. If he succeeds, he will be freed, otherwise, he will be executed. But to his surprise, Zhang discovers that he has been drawn into a far greater conspiracy against the empire than anyone had suspected.

Cast

Main
 Lei Jiayin as Zhang Xiaojing
 Jackson Yee as Li Bi

Supporting
 Zhou Yiwei as Long Bo
 Peng Guanying as Qin Zheng
 Wu Xiaoliang as Cao Poyan
 Han Tongsheng as He Zhizheng (based on He Zhizhang)
 Cai Lu as Cui Qi
 Lu Fangsheng as Yao Runeng
 Yu Ailei as Yuan Zai
 Djimon Hounsou as Master Ge (voiced by Chen Jianbin)
 Eldos Faruk as Yazedbozid (Monk Yisi)
  as Monk Jingde
 Zhao Wei as Xu Bin
 Song Yunhao as Cheng Shen (based on Cen Shen)
 Feng Jiayi as Emperor Xuanzong of Tang
 Reyizha as Tan Qi
 Xu Lu as Yan Yuhuan (based on Yang Yuhuan)
 Wang Herun as Wen Ran
 Ai Ru as Wang Runxiu
 Gao Ye as Li Xiangxiang
 Li Yuan as Yu Chang
 Wang Sisi as Ding Tong'er
 Qu Shanshan as Xu Hezi
 Zhou Lula as Li Yu
 Sukhee Ariunbyamba as Mage'er
 Yin Zhusheng as Lin Jiulang (based on Li Linfu)
 Yang Yi as Wen Wuji
 Ge Zhao'en as Prince Yong
Robert Gilabert as Pifu

Soundtrack

Production
Before shooting, Cao Dun and the screenplay writers read the original novel three times.

The crew spent 7 months building the street scenery of Chang'an city.

In order to design the costume of Taoist priest Li Bi, the crew went to consult the Chinese Taoist Association.

Shooting began on November 11, 2017, and ended on June 15, 2018.

Broadcast
The series aired on Chinese online video platform Youku on June 27, 2019. As of July 1, 2019, it got released in other Asian countries, such as Japan, Singapore, Malaysia and Vietnam. It was released in North America through video streaming website including Viki, Amazon and YouTube.

Series 1 began streaming in Australia on SBS On Demand as of 22 January 2020.

Reception
The series has earned high praises. Douban, a major Chinese media rating site, gave the drama 8.6 out of 10.

Awards and nominations

References

External links
 
 
 
 

2019 Chinese television series debuts
2019 Chinese television series endings
Television shows based on Chinese novels
Television series set in the Tang dynasty
Television series set in the 8th century
Youku original programming
2019 web series debuts
Chinese web series
Chinese historical television series